Soyuz TMA-10M was a 2013 flight to the International Space Station. It transported three members of the Expedition 37 crew to the International Space Station. TMA-10M is the 119th flight of a Soyuz spacecraft, the first flight launching in 1967. The Soyuz remained on board the space station for the Expedition 38/39 increment to serve as an emergency escape vehicle.

Crew

Backup crew

References

Crewed Soyuz missions
Spacecraft launched in 2013
2013 in Russia
Spacecraft which reentered in 2014
Spacecraft launched by Soyuz-FG rockets